The Gobbler Formation is a geologic formation in the Sacramento Mountains of New Mexico. It preserves fossils dating back to the Moscovian Age of the Pennsylvanian Period.

Description
The lower sandstone beds are well-sorted and the limestone includes black masses of chert. These beds intruded by sills possibly of Tertiary age. The upper beds interfinger with limestone assigned to the Bug Scuffle Limestone Member of the Gobbler Formation. The formation overlies the Lake Valley Limestone, from which it is separated by a subaerial erosion surface with paleochannels as deep as  The Gobbler Formation underlies the Beeman Formation.

The formation is prominently exposed at Oliver Lee Memorial State Park, where the Bug Scuffle Member forms prominent cliffs.

Fossils
The sandstone beds locally contain plant fossils. The Bug Scuffle Limestone Member is mostly sparsely fossiliferous, with occasional local concentrations of a variety of fossils including bryozoans, corals, crinoids, coralline algae, and foraminifera. These include the crinoids Lecythiocrinus and Paragassizocrinus. The base of the formation contains earliest Morrowan (Bashkirian) conodonts.

History of investigation
The unit was first named by Pray in 1954 and a type section was designated in 1961.

See also

 List of fossiliferous stratigraphic units in New Mexico
 Paleontology in New Mexico

References

Carboniferous formations of New Mexico
Carboniferous southern paleotropical deposits